Henry Vaughan (1621–1695) was a Welsh physician and metaphysical poet.

Henry Vaughan may also refer to:

Henry Vaughan (MP for Bristol), in 1486, MP for Bristol (UK Parliament constituency)
Henry Vaughan (fl.1597), MP for Carmarthen Boroughs (UK Parliament constituency)
Sir Henry Vaughan (Welsh politician, born by 1586) (by 1586–1660/61), Welsh Member of Parliament and Royalist military leader during the English Civil War
Sir Henry Vaughan (Welsh politician, born 1613) (1613–1676), Member of Parliament for Carmarthenshire, 1668–1679, and Royalist during the English Civil War
Sir Henry Halford Vaughan (1811–1885), historian
 Henry Vaughan (art collector) (1809-1899), art collector who gave The Hay Wain to the National Gallery
Henry Vaughan (architect) (1845–1917), mainly designed churches
Henry F. Vaughan, Dean of the University of Michigan School of Public Health, 1941–1959
Henry Earle Vaughan (1912–1978), American telephony engineer